The Beryl oil field is a major crude oil production field in the UK sector of the northern North Sea, 335 km north east of Aberdeen. Production of oil started in 1976 and the field is still producing oil and gas (2021).

The field 
The Beryl oil field is located in Block 9/13a of the UK North Sea. It is named after Beryl Solomon wife of Charles Solomon the President of Mobil Europe at the time of the field’s discovery. The Beryl field was discovered in May 1972 and is a Triassic and Jurassic sandstone at an average depth of 11,000 feet (3,353 m). The reservoir and the fluids have the following characteristics:

Owners and operators 
The Beryl field was originally licensed to partners comprising Mobil North Sea Ltd (50%), Amerada Hess (UK) Ltd (20%), Texas Eastern North Sea Inc. (20%), and Enterprise Oil Ltd. (10%). Mobil was the Beryl field operator. In January 2012 the Apache Corporation acquired all the assets of Mobil North Sea and from then was the operator of the Beryl field with a 50% interest. The other owners are Hess Limited (22.22%), Enterprise Oil (22.78%) and OMV (UK) Ltd (5%).

Development 
The field was initially developed in 1975 by a single integrated drilling, production and accommodation platform Beryl Alpha (or Beryl A) located in the south of the field. Beryl A has oil storage compartments in the gravity base structure. Oil is exported from Beryl A through a pair of SPM (single point mooring) buoys located 2.0 km from Beryl A. Beryl Bravo (Beryl B) was installed in 1983 and located 8 km north of Beryl A to exploit the northern part of the oil field. Oil is exported from Beryl B to Beryl A through a 20-inch pipeline.

As a ‘stranded asset’ with limited infrastructure gas was injected into the reservoir and the surplus was flared. From 1992 gas was exported via the 203 miles (327 km) 30-inch SAGE (Scottish Area Gas Evacuation) pipeline to St. Fergus. In 1990 a riser tower was added to Beryl A to accommodate risers and gas compression equipment to expert gas into SAGE. The principal data of the Beryl field platforms is given in the following table. 

The Beryl partners had sanctioned the construction of Beryl B on the understanding that uplift on allowances against Petroleum Revenue Tax would be available for the expenditure. But the UK Government intended to restrict the uplift. Mobil, on behalf of the Beryl partners, argued that if it had been known that uplift was to be withdrawn the investment in Beryl B would not have been made.

Export of oil from the field was by SPM buoys, the design details of the buoys was as follows.

In 1985 SPM1 broke free from its moorings and was damaged beyond repair. A replacement, SPM3, was installed in 1987.

An emergency flare is bridge-linked to Beryl A. This comprises a 600 feet (183 m) horizontal steel bridge. The bridge is supported by a 410 feet (125 m) high steel tower with a concrete gravity base.

Production 
Beryl A was planned to have 30 production wells and 10 gas or water injection wells.

The processing plant on Beryl A had a nominal capacity of 300,000 barrels of oil per day. There are two parallel process trains each capable of processing 150,000 bbl/day. Oil from the wellheads flows to one of the two High Pressure Separators operating at 150 psi where gas flashes off. Oil then passes to the Low Pressure Separator operating at 3 psi for further gas removal. From here oil flows to the storage tanks prior to export via the SPM buoys. Off-gas from the LP separators is compressed to 150 psi in a centrifugal compressor capable of compressing 12 MMSCFD. The compressed gas is mixed with off-gas from the HP Separator the combined flow of 150 MMSCFD is compressed in 2 stages to 5,200 psi and is injected into the reservoir. Gas injection started in November 1977.

Deoxygenated seawater was injected into the reservoir at up to 100,000 barrels per day, this commenced in January 1979.

Beryl B was planned to have 14 production wells, 5 water injection and 2 gas injection wells.

Processing plant comprised a single 3-phase Separator and an electric motor driven gas compressor.

Redevelopment 
Further fields in the Beryl area were developed through Beryl A and B.

From 1979 oil was produced from three subsea satellite wells. These were connected to Beryl A by 6-inch flowlines.

Further developments included production from small oil and gas fields in the Beryl area. Information on these fields is summarized in the table.   Nevis, Ness and Linnhe are named after Scottish lochs.

Decommissioning 
Nevis South and Linnhe subsea installations have been decommissioned.

References 

North Sea energy
North Sea oil fields
North Sea
North Sea
Oil fields of Scotland
Oil fields of the United Kingdom